William Brett may refer to:
William Brett, 1st Viscount Esher (1815–1899), British politician
William Henry Brett (missionary) (1818–1886), Anglican missionary to British Guiana
William Howard Brett (1846–1918), American librarian
William H. Brett (1893–1989), American civil servant
William Henry Brett (British Columbia politician) (1895–1972), Canadian politician in British Columbia
William Brett, Baron Brett (1942–2012), British politician